Second period may refer to:

 Ice hockey's second period of a game
 Period 2 elements of the chemical periodic table
 Second Period under communist theory, see Third Period
 Second Intermediate Period of Egypt
 2nd Persian Period
 Second Persian Period
 Second period of the Great Patriotic War
 Second Temple period
 Second Stadtholderless Period